

{{DISPLAYTITLE:Psi8 Aurigae}}

Psi8 Aurigae (ψ8 Aur, ψ8 Aurigae) is a star in the northern constellation of Auriga. It has an apparent visual magnitude of 6.443 and, based upon parallax measurements, they are approximately  distant from the Earth.

The spectrum of the star matches a stellar classification of B9.5p

See also
 Psi Aurigae

References

External links
 HR 2541
 Image Psi8 Aurigae

Auriga (constellation)
B-type main-sequence stars
Aurigae, Psi08
050037
033064
2541
Aurigae, 61
Durchmusterung objects